Susan Kaech is an American immunologist. Kaech is a professor and director of the NOMIS Center for Immunobiology and Microbial Pathogenesis at the Salk Institute for Biological Sciences. She holds the NOMIS Foundation Chair. Her research focuses on the formation of memory T cells, T cell metabolism, and cancer immunotherapy.

Education 
Kaech conducted her undergraduate studies in Cellular and Molecular Biology at the University of Washington and her PhD in Developmental Biology at Stanford University.

Awards and honors 

 HHMI Early Career Scientist, 2009
 Presidential Early Career Award for Scientists and Engineers (PECASE), 2007
 American Asthma Foundation Investigator Award, 2007
 Cancer Research Institute Investigator Award, 2005
 Edward Mallinckrodt Jr. Foundation Award, 2005
 Burroughs-Wellcome Foundation Award in Biosciences, 2003
 Damon Runyon-Walter Foundation Winchell Cancer Research Fellowship, 1999
 National Science Foundation Predoctoral Fellowship, 1993

References 

Year of birth missing (living people)
Living people
American immunologists
University of Washington alumni
Women immunologists
Stanford University alumni
American women biologists
Salk Institute for Biological Studies people
21st-century American women